Štós (before 1973 Štos; , earlier Stoos; , earlier Soosz, in the Middle Ages Hegyalja) is a village and municipality in Košice-okolie District in the Košice Region of eastern Slovakia. It is one of several towns in Bodva Valley. Other towns in Bodva Valley include: Jasov, Lucia Bania, Medzev (Metzenseifen), and Vyšný Medzev (Upper Metzenseifen).

History
The village developed from an old Slav mining settlement. After the Mongol invasion of 1241, the depopulated region was resettled by German settlers. The place-name derives from the German family name Stoss. In 1341 many privileges were given to German miners. The village passed to Jasov and in 1427 to Smolník. After that, it belonged to the local lord Ján Baglos. In 1449 Johann Kistner from Štitník gave his part of the village to Carthusian monastery of the Spiš County.

Geography

Ethnicity

Culture

References

External links
 

Villages and municipalities in Košice-okolie District